This is a list of the six members of the European Parliament for Malta in the 2014 to 2019 session.

List

Party representation

Notes

Malta
List
2014